This list of National Institute of Technology Tiruchirappalli people is a selected list of notable past staff and students of the National Institute of Technology, Tiruchirappalli.

Notable alumni

Academics

Rajkumar Chellaraj, CFO and Associate Dean, Stanford Graduate School of Business, Stanford University
V. John Mathews, Professor of Electrical Engineering and Computer Science, Oregon State University
Nagi Naganathan, President, Oregon Institute of Technology
Krishna Palem, Professor of Computing, Rice University
S. K. Ramesh, Professor of Electrical and Computer Engineering, California State University, Northridge
Nagarajan Ranganathan, Distinguished University Professor of Computer Science and Engineering, University of South Florida
Ramesh R. Rao, Director, Calit2 and Professor of Electrical and Computer Engineering, Jacobs School of Engineering, University of California, San Diego
Guruswami Ravichandran, Chair of Engineering Division, California Institute of Technology
Vallabh Sambamurthy, Dean, Wisconsin School of Business, University of Wisconsin, Madison
Nambirajan Seshadri, Professor of Practice of Electrical and Computer Engineering, University of California, San Diego
Chetan Sankar, Emeritus Professor, Raymond J. Harbert College of Business, Auburn University
Venkat Selvamanickam, Professor of Mechanical Engineering and Physics, Director of Texas Center for Superconductivity, University of Houston
Madhavan Swaminathan, Professor of Electrical and Computer Engineering, Georgia Institute of Technology
Baba C. Vemuri, Professor of Computer and Information Science and Engineering, University of Florida
Krishnaswamy Nandakumar, Professor of Chemical Engineering, Louisiana State University
Suresh Sitaraman, Professor of Mechanical Engineering, Georgia Institute of Technology

Business

 Jessie Paul, CEO and founder, Paul Writer Strategic Advisory marketing firm
 Mahesh Amalean, Chairman, MAS Holdings
 Natarajan Chandrasekaran, Chairman, Tata Sons and Tata Group
 Rajesh Gopinathan, CEO and Managing Director, Tata Consultancy Services
 T. V. Narendran, CEO and Managing Director, Tata Steel 
 R. Ravimohan, former Executive Director, Reliance Industries; former Chairman and Managing Director, CRISIL
 K. R. Sridhar, CEO and founder, Bloom Energy
 Shyam Srinivasan, CEO and Managing Director, Federal Bank
 Sidin Vadukut, former Managing Director, Mint

Arts and Entertainment

Esmayeel Shroff, film director and writer
Satish Chakravarthy, music composer; produces film scores and soundtracks in the Tamil film industry
Vanitha Rangaraju, Animator, DreamWorks Animation; Technical Lighting Director for Shrek (winner of Academy Award for Best Animated Feature at 74th Academy Awards)

Government, Politics and Social Works

Palanivel Thiagarajan, Finance Minister, Tamil Nadu

Scientists

 Balu Balachandran, Distinguished scientist, Argonne National Laboratory

Notable faculty 

 Rajeev Taranath, Classical musician

See also 
 National Institute of Technology, Tiruchirappalli
 Institutes of National Importance

References

External links 
 University website

National Institute of Technology, Tiruchirappalli
National Institute of Technology, Tiruchirappalli alumni
National Institute of Technology Tiruchirappalli people